Earl of Ossory is a subsidiary title held by the Earl of Ormond that was created in the Peerage of Ireland in 1528.

During King Henry VIII of England's pursuit of Anne Boleyn, who would be his second wife, he arranged for the main claimant to the earldom of Ormond, Piers Butler, to renounce all his claims to the titles in favour of Anne's father, Thomas Boleyn. Butler was rewarded for his compliance by being created Earl of Ossory on 22 February 1528.
 
In 1662, the eldest son of James Butler, 1st Duke of Ormonde was called to the Irish House of Lords on a writ of acceleration and became known as Thomas Butler, 6th Earl of Ossory. His father held the title "5th Earl of Ossory" as one of his subsidiary titles, which made Thomas Butler the 6th Earl by courtesy. He predeceased his father and thus never became Earl of Ormonde in his own right.

References

Butler dynasty
1528 establishments in Ireland
Dormant earldoms in the Peerage of Ireland
Noble titles created in 1528